Sinclair Smith may refer to:

 Sinclair Smith (cricketer) (born 1991), Bermudian cricketer
 Sinclair Smith (astronomer) (1899–1938), American astronomer